Sándor Ziffer (May 5, 1880, in Eger – September 8, 1962, in Baia Mare) was a Hungarian painter characterized by his strong decorative paintings and use of definite contours and colour in his works.

After 1906 he worked in Nagybánya where he settled on a permanent basis in 1918 making several trips to Paris and Berlin where he encountered forms of expressionism which impacted upon his painting. Later from 1935 to 1945, he worked as an art teacher. Six of his paintings are held in the Hungarian National Gallery.

References

External links and sources
 Fine Arts in Hungary

1880 births
1962 deaths
People from Eger
Academy of Fine Arts, Munich alumni
19th-century Hungarian painters
20th-century Hungarian painters
Hungarian male painters
19th-century Hungarian male artists
20th-century Hungarian male artists